The P'yŏngyanghwajŏn Line, or P'yŏngyang Thermal Power Plant Line, is an electrified freight-only railway line of the Korean State Railway in Pot'onggang-guyŏk and P'yŏngch'ŏn-guyŏk, P'yŏngyang, North Korea, running from Pot'onggang on the P'yŏngnam Line to P'yŏngch'ŏn, with a branch to the P'yŏngyang Thermal Power Plant (P'yŏngyanghwajŏn), from which the line gets its name).

History
The original line between Pot'onggang Station to P'yŏngch'ŏn via the P'yŏngyang Marshalling Yard was opened by the Chosen Government Railway on 21 March 1944. This was extended by the Korean State Railway in 1961, when construction of the P'yŏngyang Thermal Power Plant began. The line was given its current name at that time.

Services
The line serves a number of industries, notably the Taedonggang Battery Factory, the 26 March Electric Wire Factory, and the P'yŏngyang Thermal Power Plant in Saemaŭl-dong, P'yŏngch'ŏn-guyŏk, the Pot'onggang Organic Fertiliser Factory in Chŏngpy'ŏng-dong, P'yŏngch'ŏn-guyŏk, adjacent to the marshalling yard, and the Posok Korean Foreign Trade Company.

Route 

A yellow background in the "Distance" box indicates that section of the line is not electrified.

References

Railway lines in North Korea
Standard gauge railways in North Korea